Nancy Welford (May 31, 1904 – September 30, 1991), also known as Christine Welford, was a British-born American actress in the early sound film era. The daughter of actress Ada Loftus and actor Dallas Welford, she was born in London, England and came to the United States when she was six years old.

Welford's stage debut came as a member of the ensemble for Mimic World. As early as 1921, she was active in vaudeville. In 1922 she appeared at the Fulton Theatre on Broadway in the musical Orange Blossoms by Victor Herbert. In 1923, a caption of a photograph in the New York Daily News described her as the prima donna of a musical comedy and noted, "She has come up from the chorus and come to stay." She next joined the Gallagher and Shean duo in their performances. In 1926, Welford starred in Nancy, a musical for which she was the inspiration.

She acted in five films between 1929 and 1933. She is probably today mostly known for starring in the 1929 Warner Brothers musical Gold Diggers of Broadway, which was the second all color-all talking feature ever made. Today, Gold Diggers of Broadway is a lost film with only 2 surviving reels.

On October 24, 1924, Welford married film director F. Heath Cobb in Cleveland, Ohio. Her parents learned of the marriage about a month later, prompting her father to say, "I don't believe it", and putting her mother under a doctor's care at her home.

She married Henry C. Morris in 1945; he preceded her in death in 1985.

Welford died in San Francisco, California.

Filmography
 Gold Diggers of Broadway (1929) as Jerry
 The Phantom of the House (1929) as Dorothy Milburn
 The Jazz Cinderella (1930) as Patricia Murray
 A Safe Affair (1931) as Mary Bolton
 Yours Sincerely (1933) as Betty Braley

References

External links

 

 
 Michael G. Morris, "She's Just a Baby" Gershwin 100 (March 25, 2021), a blog post about Welford

1904 births
1991 deaths
American film actresses
American silent film actresses
20th-century American actresses
English film actresses
English silent film actresses
English stage actresses
British emigrants to the United States
Actresses from London
20th-century English actresses